The occipital emissary vein is a small emissary vein which passes through the condylar canal.

References 

Veins of the head and neck